Hey Now Hey (The Other Side of the Sky) is the nineteenth studio album by American singer-songwriter Aretha Franklin. 

Released in mid-1973 by Atlantic Records, it was the first Atlantic album by Franklin to miss the Top 25 of the main Billboard chart, peaking at #30, and reaching #2 on the R&B albums listing. This album was originally planned to be a straight jazz album with songs like "Moody's Mood" and "Just Right Tonight", but producers Franklin and Quincy Jones took a detour and produced songs like "Mister Spain" and the title cut.

Other notable songs include the No. 1 R&B and top 20 pop single "Angel" written by Franklin's younger sister Carolyn, as well as a cover of "Somewhere" which features Franklin on piano and Phil Woods on alto saxophone. This recording was reissued on compact disc through Rhino Records in the 1990s. The song "Master of Eyes" was included as the tenth track on the reissue though it was  not included on the first release.

Track listing
Side One
 "Hey Now Hey (The Other Side of the Sky)" (Aretha Franklin) - 4:41
 "Somewhere" (Leonard Bernstein, Stephen Sondheim) - 6:14
 "So Swell When You're Well" (James Booker, Aretha Franklin) - 4:14
 "Angel"  (Carolyn Franklin, Sonny Sanders) - 4:26
 "Sister from Texas" (Aretha Franklin) - 3:08
Side Two
 "Mister Spain" (Carolyn Plummer) - 6:41
 "That's The Way I Feel About Cha" (Bobby Womack, Jim Grisby, Joe Hicks) - 7:10
 "Moody's Mood" (James Moody, Jimmy McHugh, Dorothy Fields) - 2:55
 "Just Right Tonight" (Aretha Franklin, Avery Parrish, Buddy Feyne, Quincy Jones, Robert Bruce) - 7:42'
CD reissue bonus track
 "Master of Eyes (The Deepness of Your Eyes)" (Aretha Franklin, Bernice Hart) - 3:25

Personnel
 Aretha Franklin – lead vocals, acoustic piano solo (2, 3)
 Spooner Oldham – keyboards
 Billy Preston – acoustic piano solo (9)
 Jimmy Johnson – guitar
 Tommy Cogbill – bass guitar
 Jerry Jemmott – bass guitar
 Roger Hawkins – drums
 Richie Pratt – drums 
 Phil Woods – alto saxophone (2)
 Joe Farrell – tenor sax solo (4), flute solo (6)
 Willie Bridges – saxophone
 Charles Chalmers – saxophone
 Andrew Love – saxophone
 Floyd Newman – saxophone
 Wayne Jackson – trumpet

Production
 Producers – Quincy Jones and Aretha Franklin 
 Recording Engineer – Phil Schier 
 Remixing – Gene Paul (Track 1); Quincy Jones and Phil Schier (Tracks 2–9).
 Track 1 remixed at Record Plant; Tracks 2-9 remixed at Atlantic Studios (New York, NY).
 Mastered at Artisan Sound Recorders (Hollywood, CA).
 Album Design – Ken Cunningham, Jim Dunn and Aretha Franklin.
 Cover Illustration – Jim Dunn

References

1973 albums
Aretha Franklin albums
Albums produced by Quincy Jones
Atlantic Records albums